Pentafluoroethyl iodide is a suggested component of a fire-extinguishing composition.

Production
Pentafluoroethyl iodide can be produced by electrochemical fluorination of 1,1,2,2-tetrafluoro-1,2-diiodoethane.
2 C2F4I2 + 2 HF -> C2F5I + I2 + H2

It can also be produced by react tetrafluoroethylene, iodine and iodine pentafluoride.
5 C2F4 + 2 I2 + IF5 -> 5 C2F5I

Properties
Pentafluoroethyl iodide is a pungent colourless gas and an anesthetic.

Uses
Pentafluoroethyl iodide is an intermediate of preparing other compounds.

References

Organofluorides
Organoiodides
Anesthetics